Metabolomics is a peer-reviewed scientific journal covering topics including whole metabolome analysis of organisms, metabolite target analysis, with applications within animals, plants and microbes, pharmacometabolomics for precision medicine, as well as systems biology. It is published by Springer Science+Business Media and the current editor-in-chief is Roy Goodacre.

The 2018 impact factor was 3.167.

References

Publications established in 2005
English-language journals
Metabolomics journals